Piccione is Italian surname. Notable people with the surname include:

 Alessandra Piccione, Italian-Canadian screenwriter
 Anthony Piccione (1939–2001), American poet
 Clivio Piccione (born 1984), Monegasque racing driver
 Elisa Cusma Piccione (born 1981), Italian middle-distance runner

See also 

 Piccioni
 Pidgeon (surname)
 Columba

Italian-language surnames